Selliner See (Rügen) is a lake in the Vorpommern-Rügen district in Mecklenburg-Vorpommern, Germany. At an elevation of 0 m, its surface area is 

Lakes of Mecklenburg-Western Pomerania
Bays of Mecklenburg-Western Pomerania
Geography of Rügen
Bay of Greifswald
Sellin